BGN/PCGN romanization are the systems for romanization and Roman-script spelling conventions adopted by the United States Board on Geographic Names (BGN) and the Permanent Committee on Geographical Names for British Official Use (PCGN).

The systems have been approved by the BGN and the PCGN for application to geographic names, but they have also been used for personal names and text in the US and the UK.

Details of all the jointly approved systems are outlined in the National Geospatial-Intelligence Agency publication Romanization Systems and Policies (2012), which superseded the BGN 1994 publication Romanization Systems and Roman-Script Spelling Conventions. Romanization systems and spelling conventions for different languages have been gradually introduced over the course of several years. The currently used set is available on the UK government site. A complete list of BGN/PCGN systems and agreements covering the following languages is given below (the date of adoption is given in the parentheses). The status "agreement" refers to systems which were created by authorities of the corresponding nations and then adopted by BGN and PCGN.

Systems 
 BGN/PCGN romanization of Adyghe (2012 system)
 BGN/PCGN national romanization system for Afghanistan (for Pashto and Dari, 2007 system)
 BGN/PCGN romanization of Amharic (1967 system)
 BGN/PCGN romanization of Arabic (1956 system; BGN 1946, PCGN 1956)
 BGN/PCGN romanization of Armenian (1981 system)
 BGN/PCGN romanization of Avar (2011 system)
 BGN/PCGN romanization of Azerbaijani Cyrillic script (2002 table of correspondences)—note that the Government of Azerbaijan abandoned the Cyrillic script in 1991 and adopted the Roman alphabet to replace it
 BGN/PCGN romanization of Baluchi (2008 system)
 BGN/PCGN romanization of Bashkir (2007 agreement)
 BGN/PCGN romanization of Belarusian (1979 System)
 BGN/PCGN romanization of Bulgarian (BGN/PCGN 2013 agreement reflecting the official Bulgarian system.)
 BGN/PCGN romanization of Burmese (1970 agreement)
 BGN/PCGN romanization of Chechen (2008 table of correspondences)
 BGN/PCGN romanization of Chinese (1979 agreement)—Chinese characters are romanized by BGN/PCGN by means of the Pinyin system
 BGN/PCGN romanization of Chuvash (2011 system)
 BGN/PCGN romanization of Dzongkha (2010 agreement)
 BGN/PCGN romanization of Georgian (2009 agreement)
 BGN/PCGN romanization of Greek (1996 agreement)—Greek is romanized by BGN/PCGN by means of the ELOT 743 system
 BGN/PCGN romanization of Hebrew (2018 agreement)
 BGN/PCGN romanization of Inuktitut (2013 agreement)
 BGN/PCGN romanization of Japanese Kana (2017 agreement)—Japanese is romanized by BGN/PCGN by means of the modified Hepburn system)
 BGN/PCGN romanization of Kabardian (2011 system)
 BGN/PCGN romanization of Karachay-Balkar (2008 table of correspondences)
 BGN/PCGN romanization of Kazakh (1979 system)
 BGN/PCGN romanization of Khmer (1972 agreement)
 BGN/PCGN romanization of Korean (North Korea) (BGN/PCGN 1945 agreement); of Korean in North Korea—Korean is romanized by BGN/PCGN by means of the McCune–Reischauer system.
 BGN/PCGN romanization of Korean (South Korea) (2011 agreement) of Korean in South Korea—Korean is romanized by BGN/PCGN  by means of the Ministry of Culture and Tourism System (2000) system.
 BGN/PCGN romanization of Kurdish (2007 system)
 BGN/PCGN romanization of Kyrgyz (1979 system)
 BGN/PCGN romanization of Lao (1966 agreement)
 BGN/PCGN romanization of Macedonian (2013 agreement)
 BGN/PCGN romanization of Maldivian (1988 agreement, with modifications 2009)
 BGN/PCGN romanization of Moldovan (2002 table of correspondences)
 BGN/PCGN romanization of Mongolian Cyrillic (1964 system; PCGN 1957, BGN 1964)
 BGN/PCGN romanization of Nepali (2011 agreement)
 BGN/PCGN romanization of Ossetian (2009 system)
 BGN/PCGN romanization of Pashto (1968 system, 2017 revision)
 BGN/PCGN romanization of Persian (1958 system; updated 2019)
 BGN/PCGN romanization of Russian (1947 system; BGN 1944, PCGN 1947)
 BGN/PCGN romanization of Rusyn (2016 system)
 BGN/PCGN romanization of Serbian (Cyrillic script)(2005 table of correspondences)— Serbian is not romanized by BGN/PCGN; instead, the Roman script that corresponds to the Cyrillic script is used
 BGN/PCGN romanization of Shan (2011 system)
 BGN/PCGN romanization of Modern Syriac (2011 system)
 BGN/PCGN romanization of Tajik (1994 system)
 BGN/PCGN romanization of Tatar (2005 table of correspondences)
 BGN/PCGN romanization of Thai (2002 agreement)
 BGN/PCGN romanization of Tigrinya (2007 system)
 BGN/PCGN romanization of Turkmen (2000 table of correspondences)
 BGN/PCGN romanization of Udmurt (2011 system)
 BGN/PCGN romanization of Ukrainian (2019 agreement)—see Romanization of Ukrainian
 BGN/PCGN romanization of Urdu (2007 system)
 BGN/PCGN romanization of Uzbek (2000 table of correspondences)
 BGN/PCGN romanization of Yakut (2012 system)

In addition to the systems above, BGN/PCGN adopted Roman Script Spelling Conventions for languages that use the Roman alphabet but use letters not present in the English alphabet.  These conventions exist for the following four languages:
 BGN/PCGN romanization of Faroese (1968 agreement)
 BGN/PCGN romanization of German (2000 agreement)
 BGN/PCGN romanization of Icelandic (1968 agreement)
 BGN/PCGN romanization of Northern Sami (1984 agreement)

Notes

References